Marshall "Buzz" Potamkin (October 22, 1945 – April 22, 2012) was an American television producer and director known for founding his own television advertisement production studio, Perpetual Motion Pictures aka Buzzco Associates, and helping to establish Southern Star Productions. Along with advertisements, Potamkin focused on producing made-for-television animation, beginning with several television films based on the Berenstain Bears series of children's books. He went on to produce series for Turner Entertainment and, more specifically, Cartoon Network, including every episode of Cartoon Network's animated showcase series, What a Cartoon!, a project developed for aspiring animators to make pilot shorts that the network could choose to develop into full-fledged series.

Over the course of his 36-year career in animation, Potamkin was nominated for 3 Primetime Emmy Awards, 2 Daytime Emmy Awards, and 1 CableACE Award. He died on April 22, 2012, from pancreatic cancer at age 66.

Career
Potamkin is known for founding Perpetual Motion Pictures (later called Buzzco Associates) with Candy Kugel and Vincent Cafarelli in 1968, which led to the production of hundreds of television advertisements, including the Hawaiian Punch series, MTV's "Top of the Hour" (the moon man), and MTV's "I Want My MTV" campaign. He also established the companies Southern Star Productions, Visionary Media, and Project X and produced the animated specials The Berenstain Bears' Christmas Tree in 1979 and Cartoon All-Stars to the Rescue in 1990, among others.

After working at The Walt Disney Company for a short period in 1991, Potamkin was hired by Fred Seibert as Hanna-Barbera Cartoons' Executive Producer & Head of TV, where he oversaw all the studio's output and produced shorts for Cartoon Network's What a Cartoon! series through 1996.

Potamkin died from pancreatic cancer on April 22, 2012, and was survived by his wife Rosie.

Filmography

Accolades

References

External links
 
 

1945 births
2012 deaths
American television producers
Deaths from cancer in New York (state)
Deaths from pancreatic cancer
Hanna-Barbera people
Cartoon Network Studios people
American television directors